Washington National Opera may refer to:

Washington National Opera, Washington DC opera company, established 1957
Washington National Opera (1919-1936), former opera company, established 1919
A metonym for the John F. Kennedy Center for the Performing Arts, where the Washington National Opera is based